The 1945 Oregon State Beavers football team represented Oregon State College in the Pacific Coast Conference (PCC) during the 1945 college football season.  Led by eleventh-year head coach Lon Stiner, the Beavers compiled a 4–4–1 record (4–4 in PCC, fourth), and were outscored 131 to 100.  OSC played its five home games on campus at Bell Field in Corvallis.

The season marked the resumption of play after the conclusion of World War II; the Beavers last fielded a team in 1942.

Schedule

References

External links
 Game program: Oregon State at Washington State – October 6, 1945

Oregon State
Oregon State Beavers football seasons
Oregon State Beavers football